Athletics competitions at the 1970 Bolivarian Games were held at the Estadio Olímpico in Maracaibo, Venezuela, between August 25 - September 6, 1970.  

A detailed history of the early editions of the Bolivarian Games between 1938
and 1989 was published in a book written (in Spanish) by José Gamarra
Zorrilla, former president of the Bolivian Olympic Committee, and first
president (1976-1982) of ODESUR.  Gold medal winners from Ecuador were published by the Comité Olímpico Ecuatoriano.

A total of 32 events were contested, 22 by men and 10 by women.

Medal summary

Medal winners were published.

Men

Women

Medal table (unofficial)

References

Athletics at the Bolivarian Games
International athletics competitions hosted by Venezuela
Bolivarian Games
1970 in Venezuelan sport